The 2018 season is Yangon United's 9th season in the Myanmar National League since 2009.

Season Review

2018 First team squad

Continental record

Transfer

In
 Uzochukwu Emmanuel - from GFA F.C.
 Kosuke Uchida - from  Persela Lamongan
 Maung Maung Lwin - from Hantharwady United
 Suan Lam Mang - from Chin United
 Sekou Sylla - from Magway
 Aee Soe - from Yangon United Youth team
 Zin Ko - from Yangon United Youth team
 Kyaw Zin Oo - from Yangon United Youth team

Out
 Kaung Sett Naing - to  Samut Sakhon F.C.
 Kyaw Ko Ko - to  Chiangrai United
 Yankha - to Hantharwady United
 Thiha Zaw - to Sagaing United
 Saw Naing Moe Aung - to Hantharwady United
David Htan - to Shan United
Zon Moe Aung - to Zwegapin United
Suan Lam Mang - to Shan United
Thiha Htet Aung - to Zwegapin United

Honour
 2018 MFF Charity Cup ---> Champion

Coaching staff
{|class="wikitable"
|-
!Position
!Staff
|-
|Manager|| Mr. Myo Min Tun
|-
|rowspan="2"|Assistant manager|| Mr. Tin Maung Tun
|-
| U Than Wai
|-
|Technical coach|| U Nyan Win
|-
|Goalkeeper Coach|| U Win Naing
|-
|Fitness Coach|| U Zaw Naing
|-

Other information

|-

References

Yangon United